Mirja Puhakka (born 30 April 1955 in Sippola) is a Finnish ski-orienteering competitor and world champion. She received an individual gold medal at the World Ski Orienteering Championships in Avesta in 1980, and again in Lavarone in 1984. She won the relay event in the 1980 World Championships with the Finnish team, and received silver medals in 1982 and in 1984.

See also
 Finnish orienteers
 List of orienteers
 List of orienteering events

References

1955 births
Living people
People from Kouvola
Finnish orienteers
Female orienteers
Ski-orienteers
Sportspeople from Kymenlaakso